Sam Kahamba Kutesa (born 1 February 1949) is a Ugandan politician, businessman and lawyer involved in several corruption cases. By the marriage of his daughter Charlotte Kutesa Muhoozi with Muhoozi he is part of the inner circle of president Museveni. Kutesa was the Minister of Foreign Affairs in the Cabinet of Uganda, a position he held from 13 January 2005 and maintained through three cabinet reshuffles until May 2021. He was also the elected Member of Parliament (MP) for Mawogola County in Sembabule District. He was the President of the United Nations General Assembly during its 69th session in 2014–2015.

Early life and education
Kutesa attended Mbarara High School. He has a Bachelor of Laws degree from Makerere University, back when the institution was part of the University of East Africa. He also has a Postgraduate Diploma in Legal Practice from the Law Development Centre in Kampala.

Career
Kutesa was in private law practice between 1973 and 2001. He served as Member of Parliament (MP) for Mbarara North Constituency from 1980 to 1985 and as Attorney General from 1985 to 1986. Between 1994 and 1995, he served as a delegate to the Constituent Assembly that drafted the 1995 Ugandan Constitution. He was elected MP for Mawogola County in 2001 and was re-elected in 2006. He was Minister of State for Investment from 2001 to 2005. President Yoweri Museveni appointed Sam Kutesa as Minister of Foreign Affairs in 2005, following the death of James Wapakhabulo.

He is a member of the ruling National Resistance Movement political party.

Corruption
In 2011, Kutesa was accused in a parliamentary investigation of receiving bribes as kickbacks from Irish oil firm Tullow Oil. Despite calls from MPs for him to resign along with the others accused, a lawyer, Severino Twinobusingye, managed to successfully sue the Attorney General and halt the proceedings and to block the calls for resignation. Following further suspicion around the incident as a result of Tullow Oil's court case with Heritage Oil over its tax on Uganda assets, an ad-hoc parliamentary committee was convened to further investigate the allegations of corruption.

On 5 December 2018 a federal jury in New York City convicted Chi Ping Patrick Ho of paying bribes to top Ugandan officials Sam Kutesa and Yoweri Museveni. In May 2016, Ho and CEFC China executives traveled to Kampala.  Before departing, Ho ensured that $500,000 was wired to the account provided by Kutesa.  Ho also advised his boss, the Chairman of CEFC China, to provide $500,000 in cash to President Museveni, supposedly as a campaign donation, even though Museveni had already been reelected.  Ho intended these payments as bribes to influence Kutesa and Museveni to use their official power to steer business advantages to CEFC China.

United Nations General Assembly
As Africa was due to hold the presidency of the sixty-ninth session of the United Nations General Assembly (UNGA), the African Union Executive Council unanimously chose him to be their candidate after the withdrawal of Cameroonian Foreign Minister Pierre Moukoko Mbonjo. His candidature was endorsed unanimously during the 17th Ministerial Meeting of the Non-Aligned Movement, held in Algiers, Algeria in May 2013. He was officially elected by the UNGA on 11 June 2014.

Because Kutesa defended the discriminatory Uganda Anti-Homosexuality Act, 2014, human rights organizations felt his U.N. presidential position was not supportive of the values embodied in the U.N.'s Universal Declaration of Human Rights. A petition asked United States Secretary of State John Kerry to revoke Kutesa's visa and thereby keep him from assuming the role of president of the UNGA. The petition – which garnered over 15,000 signatures on Change.org – was written by Ugandan Milton Allimadi, editor of Black Star News. He highlighted Kutesa's support of the Ugandan anti-gay bill and allegations of corruption. In spite of protests and the petition, Kutesa became the president.

See also

 Foreign relations of Uganda

References

External links
 2006 UN General Assembly Address
 Full Cabinet List, May 2011
 FCPA-Uganda-Chad Prison Fine Bribery
 Brief Profile

 

|-

1949 births
Living people
Foreign Ministers of Uganda
Attorneys General of Uganda
Members of the Parliament of Uganda
Presidents of the United Nations General Assembly
Ugandan Anglicans
20th-century Ugandan lawyers
People educated at Mbarara High School
Makerere University alumni
Law Development Centre alumni
National Resistance Movement politicians
People from Sembabule District
21st-century Ugandan politicians
People named in the Paradise Papers